The 2009 Bavarian Cup was the twelfth edition of this competition, organised by the Bavarian Football Association (BFV), which was first  held in 1998. The winner and runners-up were both qualified for the 2009–10 DFB-Pokal. Additionally, this year's semi-finalist, SpVgg Unterhaching, was also qualified because it finished in the top-four of the 3. Liga.

The competition was open to all senior men's football teams playing within the Bavarian football league system and the Bavarian clubs in the Regionalliga Süd (III) and 3. Liga.

Rules and History
The seven Bezirke in Bavaria each play their own cup competition which in turn used to function as a qualifying to the German Cup (DFB-Pokal). Since 1998 these seven cup-winners plus the losing finalist of the region that won the previous event advance to the newly introduced Bavarian Cup, the Toto-Pokal. The two finalists of this competition advance to the German Cup. Bavarian clubs which play in the first and second Bundesliga are not permitted to take part in the event, their reserve teams however can.

The seven regional cup winners plus the finalist from last season's winners region were qualified for the first round.

Participating clubs
The following eight clubs qualified for the 2009 Bavarian Cup:

Bavarian Cup season 2008–09 
Teams qualified for the next round in bold.

Regional finals

 The runners-up of the Oberbayern Cup is the eights team qualified for the Bavarian Cup due to SpVgg Unterhaching from Oberbayern having won the Cup in the previous season.

First round

Semi-finals

Final

DFB Cup 2009–10
The two clubs, SpVgg Weiden and Wacker Burghausen, who qualified through the Bavarian Cup for the 2009–10 drew the following first-round opposition:

References

External links
 Bavarian FA website  

Bavarian Cup seasons
Bavarian